Zipsendorfer Fußballclub Meuselwitz is a German association football club from Meuselwitz, Thuringia.

History
The origins of the club go back to the establishment of Aktivist Zipsendorf in 1919. After World War II the club played as BSG Aktivist Zipsendorf and enjoyed some early minor success with three consecutive titles (1954–56) in the Kreisliga Altenburg and a 1962 win in local cup play. However, the club remained mired in the lower echelons of East German competition. When the community of Zipsendorf was merged into nearby Meuselwitz in 1976 the team was re-christened BSG Aktivist Meuselwitz. In 1991, after German re-unification the year before, the club briefly joined SV Bergbau as that association's football department before going their own way, first as FV Zipsendorf and then, in 1994, as Zipsendorfer Fußballclub Meuselwitz.

Mid-way through the decade the club began an ascent out of the lower divisions of German football. Between 1993 and 1997 they worked their way up through four different divisions on the strength of four consecutive titles before settling into the Landesliga Thuringia (V) for seven seasons.

Under coach Damian Halata the club reached the semi-finals of the 2003 Thüringerpokal (Thuringia Cup) and the following season captured the Landesliga title to advance to the NOFV-Oberliga Süd (IV) where they played for five seasons until winning promotion to the Regionalliga Nord in 2009. After three seasons at this level the club moved to the Regionalliga Nordost in 2012 when this league was reformed. It has been playing as a mid-table side in this league since.

The association has grown to include departments for bowling and cheerleading.

Stadium
The club plays its home matches in the bluechip-Arena (capacity 5,000) named under a sponsorship agreement with a local computer firm. The facility was constructed as the Stadion Glaserkuppe in 1953 and refurbished over a two-year period ending in 2004.

Current squad

Honours
The club's honours:
 NOFV-Oberliga Süd (V)
 Champions: 2009
 Landesliga Thüringen (V)
 Champions: 2004
 Landesklasse Ost (V)
 Champions: 1997
 Kreisliga Altenburg (VI)
 Champions: 1994
 Bezirksliga Gera (VI)
 Champions: 1996
 Bezirksklasse Gera (VII)
 Champions: 1995

Recent seasons
The recent season-by-season performance of the club:

 With the introduction of the Regionalligas in 1994 and the 3. Liga in 2008 as the new third tier, below the 2. Bundesliga, all leagues below dropped one tier.

References

External links
Official team site
Abseits Guide to German Soccer
Das deutsche Fußball-Archiv historical German football league tables (in German)

Football clubs in Germany
Football clubs in East Germany
Football clubs in Thuringia
Association football clubs established in 1919
1919 establishments in Germany